Monochroa conspersella is a moth of the family Gelechiidae. In Europe, it is found from the Alps to the north. In the east, the range extends to the southern Ural and the Middle Volga, as well as Japan.

The wingspan is 11–12 mm. Adults are on wing from May to August.

The larvae feed on Lysimachia vulgaris. They mine the leaves of their host plant. The mine has the form of a lower surface blotch with irregular corridor-like extensions. The center of the mine is brownish and the frass is dispersed. After overwintering, the larvae bore the stem of their host plant. The larvae can be found from September to the beginning of winter. Pupation probably takes place outside of the mine.

References

Moths described in 1854
Monochroa
Moths of Japan
Moths of Europe